Tegan Riding (born 9 November 1993) is an Australian football (soccer) player, who played for Adelaide United and Canberra United in the Australian W-League. Riding has been praised for her athletic ability and work ethic.

References

1993 births
Living people
Australian women's soccer players
Adelaide United FC (A-League Women) players
Canberra United FC players
A-League Women players
Women's association football midfielders